Red Kross is the debut EP of Benestrophe, self-released in 1990.

Track listing

Personnel
Adapted from the Red Kross liner notes.

Benestrophe
 Dwayne Dassing – programming, engineering, mixing, mastering
 Gary Dassing – programming, engineering, mixing, mastering
 Richard Mendez – vocals

References

External links 
 Red Kross at Discogs (list of releases)

1990 debut EPs
Benestrophe albums
Alfa Matrix EPs